Plastoquinol/plastocyanin reductase (plastoquinol/plastocyanin oxidoreductase, cytochrome f/b6 complex) is an enzyme with systematic name plastoquinol:oxidized-plastocyanin oxidoreductase. This enzyme catalyses the following chemical reaction

 plastoquinol + 2 oxidized plastocyanin + 2 H+ [side 1]  plastoquinone + 2 reduced plastocyanin + 2 H+ [side 2]

Plastoquinol reductase contains two b-type cytochromes, two c-type cytochromes (cn and f), and a [2Fe-2S] Rieske cluster.

See also 
 Cytochrome b6f complex
 Electron transport chain
 Light-dependent reactions

References

External links 
 

EC 1.10.9